Souls at Zero is the third studio album by the American avant-garde metal band Neurosis. It was released in 1992 by the Alternative Tentacles record label. It was reissued in 1999 with bonus tracks on the band's own Neurot Recordings label. On February 15, 2010, the album was reissued on CD and digitally with new artwork by Neurot. On February 14, 2012, a fully remastered version was released on vinyl by Relapse Records. The album was deducted into Decibel Magazine's Hall of Fame in August of 2016.

Track listing

Personnel
Neurosis
 Scott Kelly − lead vocals, guitar
 Steve Von Till − lead vocals, guitar
 Dave Edwardson − bass guitar, backing vocals
 Simon McIlroy − keyboards, synthesizers, samples, effects, backing vocals
 Jason Roeder − drums, percussions

Additional musicians
 Adam Kendall − visual media
 Kris Force − violin, viola
 Sarah Augros − flute
 Walter P. Sunday − cello
 Siovhan King − trumpet

Technical personnel
 Neurosis − production
 Bill Thompson − production, engineering
 Jello Biafra − mixing
 Malcolm Sherwood − engineering
 Jeffrey Gray − engineering
 Jeff Fogerty − engineering

Release history

References

1992 albums
Neurosis (band) albums